The velvet-mantled drongo (Dicrurus modestus) is a species of bird in the family Dicruridae.
It is found from Nigeria and Cameroon to the Democratic Republic of Congo and Angola.

References

Gill, F and D Donsker (Eds). 2012. IOC World Bird Names (v 2.11). Available at http://www.worldbirdnames.org/ [Accessed 2/27/2012].

velvet-mantled drongo
Birds of West Africa
Birds of the Gulf of Guinea
velvet-mantled drongo